Black Magic, later retitled Meeting at Midnight for television, is a 1944 mystery film directed by Phil Rosen and starring Sidney Toler as Charlie Chan.

It was the third Charlie Chan film made by Toler at Monogram Pictures.

Plot
Charlie postpones his trip home from service with the government to Honolulu to help with the investigation of murder involving Number One Daughter (Frances Chan) and an easily spooked chauffeur (Mantan Moreland).

Mr. William Bonner is murdered in the middle of a seance with a total of 8 witnesses, seen and unseen, present. Charlie Chan's daughter Frances Chan (real name Chan) is one of the witnesses and is detained. When police learn of Frances's true identity as Charlie Chan's daughter, he is summoned to police headquarters. The police offer the case to the famous Chinese Detective and he reluctantly agrees in order to get his daughter released. The police cannot find a gun anywhere in the house. Police then learn from the coroner that Mr. Bonner was shot and the bullet did 
not go all the way thorough, yet it is not lodged anywhere in the body. The seance room is
supported by a gadget room to assist in the various ghostly appearances. Birmingham Brown's
comedy with the various seance gadgets serve to link the movie audience with a "me too" bond which is very warm and human. Since there was no gun and no bullet, Charlie Chan has the Coroner perform an experiment to determine what might have happened. The case is solved when the murderer brushes up against Charlie Chan in a reenactment of the crime with Charlie Chan sitting where the murdered man was sitting.

Cast
Sidney Toler as Charlie Chan
Mantan Moreland as Birmingham Brown
Frances Chan as Frances Chan
Joseph Crehan as Police Sgt. Matthews
Helen Beverly as Norma Duncan / Nancy Wood (as Helen Beverley)
Jacqueline deWit as Justine Bonner
Geraldine Wall as Harriet Green
Ralph Peters as Officer Rafferty
Frank Jaquet as Paul Hamlin

Reception
The Los Angeles Times said the climax was "unusually absorbing".

See also
List of American films of 1944

References

External links
Black Magic at Charlie Chan Family
Complete film at Internet Archive

1944 films
1944 crime films
American black-and-white films
Charlie Chan films
Monogram Pictures films
1944 mystery films
American crime films
American mystery films
Films directed by Phil Rosen
1940s American films
1940s English-language films